That's Me in the Bar is the second studio album by American singer-songwriter A. J. Croce, released in 1995.

Track listing
All songs written by A.J. Croce, except where noted

"That's Me in the Bar" (Croce, David Curtis) – 3:54
"Sign on the Line" (Croce, Ramsey McClean) – 2:53
"She's Waiting for Me" – 2:47
"Checkin' In" – 2:34
"Music Box" – 2:49
"Callin' Home" – 2:10
"Night Out on the Town" – 3:17
"Pass Me By" – 2:38
"I Meant What I Said" – 3:50
"Maybe I'm to Blame" – 2:14
"I Confess" – 3:14
"Some People Call It Love" – 4:15

Personnel
A.J. Croce – piano, vocals
Sweet Pea Atkinson – vocals
Robert Becker – viola
Sir Harry Bowens – vocals
Stephen Bruton – guitar
Ry Cooder – bass, mandolin, slide guitar
Rudy Copeland – organ
Bruce Dukov – violin
Robben Ford – guitar
Bob Glaub – bass
John Goux – guitar, slide guitar
David Hidalgo – accordion
Dan Higgins – clarinet
Suzie Katayama – cello
Jim Keltner – bass, drums
John Leftwich – bass, acoustic bass
Mitch Manker & his Brass Section – trumpet
Jonell Mosser – vocals
Sid Page – violin
Dean Parks – guitar
Billy Payne – piano
Bill Reichenbach Jr. – trombone
Waddy Wachtel – guitar

Production
Producer: Jim Keltner
Arranger: David Hidalgo, John Leftwich

References

A. J. Croce albums
1995 albums
Private Music albums